Conotrachelus posticatus is a species of true weevil in the beetle family Curculionidae. It is found in North America. It can be found in insect galls and is a prey item for Ambystoma jeffersonianum. This species is  sexually dimorphic. It can be a pest of avocado plants.

References

Further reading

 
 

Molytinae
Articles created by Qbugbot
Beetles described in 1837